The Robert Burns Fellowship is a New Zealand literary residency. Established in 1958 to coincide with bicentennial celebrations of the birth of Robert Burns, it is often claimed to be New Zealand's premier literary residency. The list of past fellows includes many of New Zealand's most notable 20th and 21st century writers.

Overview and history
The fellowship was established in 1958 by an anonymous group of citizens of Dunedin, including notably Charles Brasch and his cousins the de Beers. Its purpose is "to encourage and promote imaginative New Zealand literature, liberally interpreted to include writers of genres such as literary biography, autobiography and literary criticism". It marked 200 years since the birth of Robert Burns, and also the service provided by the Burns family to the development of the Otago region, including Thomas Burns who was a nephew of the poet. It was the first literary fellowship in New Zealand.

Michael King, who received the fellowship in 1998, said at the time: "If the Burns Fellowship did not exist, New Zealand literature might be a decade or so behind the place where it is now. Some things simply wouldn't have been written." As an example, he noted that Janet Frame, one of New Zealand's best-known authors, was only able to stay in New Zealand and continue to write because of the resources provided by the fellowship.

The fellowship is based at the University of Otago. It provides a stipend to recipients for between six months to a year, as well as an office on campus.

To commemorate the 50th anniversary of the fellowship, a collection titled Nurse to the Imagination: Fifty years of the Robert Burns Fellowship was launched in October 2008, along with commemorations to coincide with Dunedin's 2008 Arts Festival.

Robert Burns Fellows
The writers to have held the fellowship are listed below:

 1959 Ian Cross
 1960 Maurice Duggan
 1961 John Caselberg
 1962 R. A. K. Mason
 1963 Maurice Shadbolt
 1964 Maurice Gee
 1965 Janet Frame
 1966–67 James K. Baxter
 1968 Ruth Dallas
 1969 Warren Dibble
 1970 O. E. Middleton 
 1971 Noel Hilliard 
 1972 Ian Wedde 
 1973 Graham Billing 
 1974 Hone Tuwhare 
 1975 Witi Ihimaera 
 1976 Sam Hunt 
 1977 Keri Hulme 
 1977–78 Roger Hall
 1978 Peter Olds
 1979 Michael A. Noonan 
 1980 Philip Temple 
 1981–82 William Sewell 
 1983 Rawiri Paratene 
 1984 Brian Turner 
 1985–86 Cilla McQueen 
 1987 Robert Lord 
 1988 John Dickson 
 1989 Renée 
 1990 David Eggleton 
 1991 Lynley Hood 
 1992 Owen Marshall 
 1993 Stuart Hoar 
 1994 Christine Johnston 
 1995 Elspeth Sandys 
 1996 Bernadette Hall
 1997 Paddy Richardson
 1998–99 Michael King 
 1999 Paula Boock 
 2000 James Norcliffe 
 2001 Jo Randerson
 2002 Alison Wong
 2003 Nick Ascroft
 2003 Sarah Quigley
 2004 Katherine Duignan 
 2005–06 Catherine Chidgey
 2006 Dianne Ruth Pettis
 2007 Laurence Fearnley
 2008 Sue Wootton
 2009 Michael Harlow
 2010 Michele Powles
 2011 Fiona Farrell
 2012 Emma Neale
 2013 David Howard
 2014 Majella Cullinane
 2015 Louise Wallace
 2016 Victor Rodger
 2017 Craig Cliff
 2018 Rhian Gallagher
 2019 Emily Duncan
 2020 John Newton
 2021 Becky Manawatu
 2022 Albert Belz

See also
University of Otago College of Education / Creative New Zealand Children's Writer in Residence

References

External links
University of Otago Robert Burns Fellowship page
Press release 2001

Robert Burns
New Zealand literary awards
1958 establishments in New Zealand
Awards and prizes of the University of Otago